Kabula is an administrative ward in the Busokelo District of the Mbeya Region of Tanzania. In 2016 the Tanzania National Bureau of Statistics report there were 7,225 people in the ward, from 10,271 in 2012.

Villages / vitongoji 
The ward has 4 villages and 15 vitongoji.

 Kitema
 Ipyasyo
 Lubaga
 Lwale
 Ngulu
 Kapyu
 Kapyu Chini
 Kikota
 Mbegele
 Kanyelele
 Kanyelele
 Kasebe
 Ntangasale
 Ndembo
 Ikambak
 Itete
 Kagwina
 Malambo
 Ndembo

References

Wards of Mbeya Region